Sin Ti (Spanish "Without You") may refer to:

Songs
"Sin Ti" (Chino & Nacho song), 2012
"Sin Ti" (Inna song), 2019
"Sin Ti" (Samo song), 2013
"Sin Ti" (Yolandita Monge song), 2015
"Sin Ti", song by Antony Santos, 2003
"Sin Ti", song by Aleks Syntek y La Gente Normal 
"Sin Ti", song by Badfinger, 1972
"Sin Ti", song by José José
"Sin Ti" by La Ley (band), 2014
"Sin Ti" by Luis Miguel and Los Panchos
"Sin Ti", song by Nelly Furtado and Tommy Torres
"Sin Ti", song by Sunny & the Sunliners

Albums
"Sin Ti" (Antony Santos album)

Television
Sin ti (TV series), a 1997 telenovela